The Packard Hawk is a model of automobile. It was the sportiest of the four Packard-badged Studebakers produced in 1958, the final year of Packard production.

History and description
The Packard Plant in Detroit, Michigan had been leased to Curtiss-Wright (and would be soon sold to them), and Packard models in this dying-gasp year were all rebadged and retrimmed Studebaker products. The 1958 Packard Hawk was essentially a Studebaker Golden Hawk 400 with a fiberglass front end and modified deck lid. It was positioned as an alternative to the market favorite Ford Thunderbird, which offered an all new version in 1958 as well.

Instead of the Studebaker Hawk's upright Mercedes-style grille, the Packard Hawk had a wide, low opening just above the front bumper and covering the whole width of the car.  Above this, a smoothly sloping nose, and hood—reminiscent of the 1953 Studebakers, but with a bulge as on the Golden Hawk—accommodating the engine's McCulloch supercharger that gave the Studebaker 289 in³ (4.7 L) V8 a total of 275 bhp (205 kW).  At the rear, the sides of the fins were coated in metallized PET film, giving them a shiny metallic gold appearance.  A fake spare-tire bulge adorned the 1953-style Studebaker deck lid.  PACKARD appeared across the nose, with a gold Packard emblem in script—along with a Hawk badge—on the trunk lid and fins.

The interior was full leather, with full instrumentation in an engine-turned dash.  As on early aircraft and custom boats, padded armrests were mounted outside the windows, a rare touch.

The styling was definitely controversial, often described as 'vacuum-cleaner' or 'catfish' by detractors. The styling has come to be appreciated more today than in its debut.  Only 588 were sold, with Packard's impending demise a likely contributing factor.  Most were equipped with the Borg-Warner three-speed automatic transmission.  Approximately 28 were produced with the B-W T85 3-speed w/overdrive manual transmission.  Studebaker-Packard was the first manufacturer to popularize the limited slip differential, which they termed Twin-Traction.  Most Packard Hawks came with TT.  It was certainly the fastest Packard ever sold, since it shared the majority of its components with Studebaker's Golden Hawk.  The price was $3995, about $700 higher than the Studebaker model, but with a more luxurious interior.  Electric window-lifts and power seats were optional extras.

Its rarity and status as the best-regarded of the 'Packardbaker' final-year cars have made the Packard Hawk quite collectible.  Values are roughly double those of the equivalent Studebaker, although they are still low by comparison with Corvettes and Thunderbirds.  Because a Studebaker drivetrain was used, mechanical parts are more readily available, although body and trim parts are more difficult-to-impossible to find.  While it is a unique car, current restoration costs almost always exceed the selling price.

Specifications
Engine

Type: Cast iron 90° V8, Silver Light dish-type pistons
Displacement: 289 cubic inches
Bore X stroke: 3.56 X 3.63 inches
Compression ratio: 7.5:1
Power @ rpm: 275 hp (205 kW) @ 4,800 rpm
Torque @ rpm:  @ 3,200 rpm
Valvetrain: In-head valves, solid lifters
Main bearings: 5
Ignition: Delco-Remy breaker-point
Fuel system: 2-bbl Stromberg 380475 downdraft carburetor, McCulloch supercharger,  max
Lubrication system: Full-pressure, gear-driven
Electrical system: 12-volt, 30 amperes
Exhaust system: Cast iron, dual exhaust

Transmission
Type: Borg-Warner Flightomatic automatic
Ratios
1st: 2.40:1
2nd: 1.47:1
3rd: 1.0:1
Reverse: 2.0:1

Differential
 Type: Semi-floating hypoid, Twin-Traction Spicer-Thornton limited slip
 Ratio: 3.31:1

Steering
 Type: Power assist, Saginaw recirculating ball
 Ratio: 19.2:1
 Turns, lock-to-lock: 4.5
 Turning circle: 

Brakes
 Type: Four wheel, power-assist Wagner hydraulic
 Front: Cast-iron finned drum, 11 X 2.5 in
 Rear: Cast-iron drum, 10 X 2 in
 Swept area: 172.8 sq in

Chassis & Body

 Construction: All-steel, box section, double-drop side rails, 5 crossmembers
 Body style: Two-door, five passenger hardtop, soft top prototype
 Layout: Front engine, rear-wheel drive

Suspension
 Front: Individual unequal-length upper and lower control arms, coil springs, hydraulic shocks, anti-sway bar
 Rear: Live axle, semi-elliptic leaf springs, hydraulic shocks

Wheels & Tires
 Wheels: Kelsey-Hays tubeless 5-lug stamped steel
 Front/rear: 5.5 X 14 in 
 Tires: Classic bias-ply
 Front/rear: 8.00 X 14 in

Weights & Measures
 Wheelbase: 
 Overall length: 
 Overall width: 
 Overall height: 
 Front track: 
 Rear track: 
 Shipping weight: 

Capacities
 Crankcase: 
 Cooling system: 
 Fuel tank: 
 Transmission: 

Calculated Data
 Bhp per c.i.d.: 0.95
 Weight per bhp: 

Performance
 0–60 mph (96.5 km/h): 12.0 seconds
 ¼ mile ET: 16.7 seconds @ 
 Top speed:  
 Fuel mileage: 12 mpg city, 20 mpg highway

Production
 1958 Packard Hawk: 588

Sources

External links

 Packard Automobile Classics, Inc. - The Packard Club
 Packard Motor Car Information
 Homepage of the National Packard Museum

Hawk
Coupés
Cars introduced in 1958